BuKo (Buhay Komedya) is a Philippine pay television channel owned by MediaQuest Holdings, Inc. through Cignal TV, in partnership with APT Entertainment based in Mandaluyong. The name is derived after Buko, a Filipino term of coconut, which consists of comedic-entertainment programs for gag, sitcoms and variety shows, dubbed as the country's first local comedy channel. It was first announced in November 2019 and made its official launch on August 2, 2021, exclusively on satellite providers Cignal and SatLite.

Programming
BuKo's programming content consists of classic local comedy shows from TV5, GMA Network and IBC, including the ones produced by TAPE Inc., M-Zet Productions, FOCUS Entertainment, Our Own Little Way Productions and APT Entertainment as well as a handful of original programming. The programming is divided into three programming blocks:

 BuKo Originals – the channel's flagship block consist of its original programs.
 Tawang Pinoy Klasiks! – the channel's treasure trove of classic comedies block.
 Throwback Tawanan – the channel's variety of popular programs block consist of comedy series and game shows.

Current programs
Fantasy
Leya, ang Pinakamagandang Babae sa Ilalim ng Lupa 
ParangNormal Activity 
Pidol's Wonderland 

Sitcom
1 for 3 
Daddy Di Do Du 
Mac and Chiz 
Okay Ka, Fairy Ko! 
Pepito Manaloto 

Drama
Tabachingching 

Gag Show
Bubble Gang 
Lokomoko 
Wow Mali 
 

Game Show
Fill in the Bank 
Bawal na Game Show 
Celebrity Samurai 

Talk Show
Mongolian Barbecue 

BuKo Originals
Maine Goals 
Kusina ni Mamang 
BalitaOneNan

Former programs
Tropang Trumpo 
MooMoo and Me 
Iskul Bukol 
Tinderella 
Sugo Mga Kapatid

See also
TV5
One Sports
Sari-Sari Channel
GMA Network
Pinoy Hits
IBC 13 
APT Entertainment
Jeepney TV

References

TV5 Network channels
Television networks in the Philippines
Filipino-language television stations
Television channels and stations established in 2021
Cignal TV